Liboš is a municipality and village in Olomouc District in the Olomouc Region of the Czech Republic. It has about 600 inhabitants.

History
The first written mention of Liboš is from 1078.

References

Villages in Olomouc District